Blagoveshchensky District  is an administrative and municipal district (raion), one of the twenty in Amur Oblast, Russia. Its administrative center is the city of Blagoveshchensk (which is not administratively a part of the district). Population:  18,673 (2002 Census);

Administrative and municipal status
Within the framework of administrative divisions, Blagoveshchensky District is one of the twenty in the oblast. The city of Blagoveshchensk serves as its administrative center, despite being incorporated separately as an urban okrug—an administrative unit with the status equal to that of the districts.

As a municipal division, the district is incorporated as Blagoveshchensky Municipal District. Blagoveshchensk Urban Okrug is incorporated separately from the district.

References

Notes

Sources

Districts of Amur Oblast
 

